The Most Venerable Bhaddanta Āciṇṇa, more commonly referred to as the Pa-Auk Sayadaw, is a Burmese Theravāda monk, meditation teacher and the abbot of the Pa-Auk Forest Monastery in Mawlamyine.

Āciṇṇa ordained as a novice in 1944, receiving full ordination in 1954. Immersed in the study of the Pāli Canon from his days as a novice, Āciṇṇa gradually broadened his scope of attention to include meditation, initially training under Mahasi Sayadaw and U Paṇḍitā. Not long after, Āciṇṇa would also decide to become a forest monk. In the months and years to follow, he would deepen his meditation abilities under the Kathitwaing, Thanlyin and Shwetheindaw sayadaws, eventually developing his own set of meditation methods, often collectively referred to as the "Pa-Auk method".

On July 21, 1981, Āciṇṇa succeeded the Phelhtaw Sayadaw Aggapañña, at the latter's invitation, as the abbot of the Pa-Auk Forest Monastery. The monastery would then grow into a network of meditation centres across Southeast Asia and beyond, and is currently the largest network in Myanmar.

Awards and honours
In 2010, the national government awarded Āciṇṇa the title of Aggamahā Saddhammajotikadhaja. In 2018, his title was raised to that of Abhidhaja Aggamahā Saddhammajotika. In 2021, his  title was raised to that of Aggamahāpandita.

In May 2017, Āciṇṇa was conferred an honorary doctorate of philosophy from Mahachulalongkornrajavidyalaya University in Bangkok, Thailand.

References

External links
Downloadable books by the Pa-Auk sayadaw

1934 births
People from Ayeyarwady Region
Burmese Theravada Buddhists
Theravada Buddhist monks
Burmese Buddhist monks
Students of Mahasi Sayadaw
Students of U Pandita
Pa-Auk Society
20th-century Burmese writers
21st-century Burmese writers
Burmese spiritual writers
Living people